Guiuan ([ˈgiˌwan] ;), officially the Municipality of Guiuan, is a 2nd class municipality in the province of Eastern Samar, Philippines. It constitutes the southeastern extremity of Samar Island and some adjacent islands, surrounded by major bodies of water including Leyte Gulf and the Philippine Sea (which a marginal sea of the Pacific Ocean). According to the 2020 census, it has a population of 53,361 people, making it the most populous municipality in Eastern Samar (followed by Dolores) and the second most populous administrative division in the entire province after the capital city Borongan.

Guiuan played a significant part in Philippine history. Historical accounts attested that Ferdinand Magellan's 16th century expedition first landed on the island of Homonhon, which lies within the municipality, after their Pacific crossing. The Immaculate Conception Parish Church in the Guiuan poblacion was established in the 18th century by Jesuits and is one of the oldest in the country.

During the Second World War, the islands of Suluan and Homonhon, both in Guiuan, became the American forces' first landing points, along with Dinagat Island, for the start of the Battle of Leyte Gulf. After the victory of Leyte Gulf operation, the entire town served as one of the naval bases for the Allies. In 1949, the Guiuan island of Tubabao hosted thousands of White Russian refugees fleeing from the wake of the Russian Revolution and Russian Civil War.

In November 2013, Guiuan was nearly levelled after Typhoon Haiyan, one of the deadliest and strongest tropical cyclones in the Philippines, made its first landfall in the town. Local and international aid helped Guiuan recover from the typhoon's catastrophic impact, and the town's economy has since flourished. Due to the COVID-19 pandemic, the town saw border restrictions and multiple lockdowns that affected the local economy and way of life.

As well as a rich historical background, Guiuan has many scenic spots. Being a coastal town on the Pacific side, the town has many white-sand beaches that are suitable for swimming and surfing. The Immaculate Conception Parish Church of Guiuan is currently in the tentative list for UNESCO World Heritage Sites under the Baroque Churches of the Philippines (Extension).

History

Guiuan is widely known for two significant events in history 423 years apart. In 1521, Ferdinand Magellan, first European to set foot on Philippine soil, landed in Homonhon, now part of Guiuan. In 1944, the American Forces landed on the island of Suluan where they fought their first battle in the Philippine territory three days before Gen. Mac Arthur stormed the beaches of Leyte. The Americans built a military base for its torpedo boats, warships, bombers and fighter planes. The base was the biggest American supply base in the Pacific during the war. About 100,000 American servicemen were stationed in Guiuan and nearby towns.

The Spanish priest and historian Juan José Delgado was stationed in Guiuan in the 18th century. In his book Biblioteca Histórica Filipina: Historia general sacro-profana, política y natural de las islas del poniente llamadas Filipinas (1751), he recorded the old name of the region as "Guiguan." He describes it as a thin stretch of land on the southern tip of Samar. He also describes the nearby islands of "Omonhon" (Homonhon), "Soloan" (Suluan), Tubabao, "Manicaui" (Manicani), and other small islets and settlements.

The occurrence of World War II shook the town and people moved to the mountains to find comfort. On June 28, 1943, several Japanese soldiers set foot on Guiuan soil. Not as fearful and brutal as they were thought of by the local populace, a cordial relation soon existed between the conquered and the conquerors. Evacuees came down from the mountains and resumed a normal urban life. Except for a few killings of suspected traitors by both Japanese, Filipino soldiers and local guerillas, not a drop of blood was shed needlessly. This made Guiuan one of the few places in the islands where World War II did not leave so many tragic memories.

The first sign of liberation of the town came on November 27, 1944, when a US Navy submarine chaser steamed the harbor for reconnaissance duty. On December 1, 1944, a fleet of LCTs, Liberty ships and barges poured into the Guiuan Bay to unload machines that was to transform Guiuan into one of the biggest Naval Bases, Leyte-Samar Naval Base, in the Far East that time, set up by the American Navy, part of the Allies. Some aircraft landed on the airstrip to rendezvous with the Necessary Evil squadrons.

Now all that is left of the American occupation are concrete slabs which once served as the foundations of a vast supply depot, and an air strip, which now serves as the town's own airport.

In 1949, the International Refugee Organisation made an appeal to tackle the displacement crisis caused by the war and a precursor to the UNHCR. It wanted new homes for thousands of White Russians in the aftermath of the Bolshevik Revolution (Russian Revolutions) and subsequent civil war. More than 5,000 of them, under the care of John Maximovitch (Saint John of Shanghai and San Francisco), the Orthodox Archbishop of Shanghai who would later be canonised, were taken to the island of Tubabao, located a couple of hundred metres from the coast of Guiuan. The Russian refugees made Guiuan their home until 1951, when they moved to Australia and the United States.

In 1952, the sitios of Talisay, Bagambang, Calamrisan, Lo-ok and Barawalti, belonging to Barrio Tubabao, were separated and created into the barrio of Trinidad.

On November 10, 1978, Proclamation No. 1801 was issued declaring Guiuan as a Tourist Zone and Marine Reserve under the administration and control of the Philippine Tourism Authority (PTA).

On November 8, 2013, the city suffered heavy damage, along with 107 fatalities, 16 missing and over 3,626 injuries, as it was hit by the eye of Typhoon Haiyan (Super Typhoon Yolanda) with maximum ten-minute sustained wind speeds of 230 km/h (145 mph). Haiyan made its first landfall over Guiuan at 04:40 PhST.

Almost every building was heavily damaged or deroofed, including the designated typhoon shelters, the Catholic Church, hospital and gymnasium. However, one house in Lactason remained intact because of the owner's effort to hold it in place with her bare hands. The woman was later identified as Mana Maring, a moron (a Filipino delicacy) maker and vendor.

Geography

The municipality of Guiuan is located at the southeasternmost tip of Samar Island. It is bounded on the north by the municipality of Mercedes, on the east by the Philippine Sea and the Pacific Ocean, on the south by the Surigao Strait, and on the west by Leyte Gulf.

Clustered around the municipality are numerous islands and islets such as Manicani, Calicoan, Sulangan, Candulo, Homonhon, Suluan and Tubabao. They are protected as part of the marine reserve known as the Guiuan Protected Landscape and Seascape.

It has a total land area of 175.49 square kilometres. It is composed of sixty (60) barangays and the only town in the province with biggest number of island barangays.

Barangays
Guiuan is politically subdivided into 60 barangays, 37 of which is located in the mainland of Guiuan, i.e. the portion of Guiuan that is contiguous with the Samar Island, and the remaining 23 in the islands surrounding the mainland.

Mainland barangays
Poblacion barangays: The poblacion, or town center, is located on the southwestern coastal area of the Guiuan mainland, facing Leyte Gulf. A ward is named before the Allies headquarters and served as a Medical center for the Allies Western Pacific Command.

Other mainland barangays:

Island barangays

Barangays in Homonhon Island:
 Bitaugan
 Cagusu-an 
 Canawayon 
 Casuguran
 Culasi
 Habag 
 Inapulangan
 Pagbabangnan

Barangays in Tubabao Island and neighboring islets:
 Camparang
 San Antonio
 San Juan
 San Pedro
 Trinidad

Barangays in Calicoan Island and neighboring islets:
 Baras
 Ngolos
 Pagnamitan
 Sulangan

Barangays in Manicani Island:
 Banaag
 Buenavista
 Hamorawon
 San Jose

Other island barangays:
 Victory - Victory Group of Islands
 Suluan - Suluan Island

Climate

Demography

Guiuan recorded a total population of 38,694 in 2000, which rose to 47,037 in 2010 and 52,991 in 2015. It has the second largest population in Eastern Samar (after Borongan) with a population density of 270 persons per km2.

Majority or 97.7% of the Guiuananons speak the Waray-Waray language. Less than 3.0% speak Cebuano (including the Boholano dialect) and Tagalog. A few percentage can converse in English, with varying degrees of proficiency.

Economy

Guiuan is classified as a second income class municipality as of CY 2008. Its Total Financial Resources amounted to 67.71 million pesos. Its Internal Revenue Allotment (IRA) represents 78.0% of its total financial resources.

Being a fishing community and the only municipality with the most number of island barangays, the town is rich in fishery and aquatic resources. It is considered by the fisheries authorities as the best fishing belt in the region.

The coastal waters offer almost all species of marine life: euchuema, abalone, ornamental fish, lobster and the golden cowry (known for its extraordinary golden sheen). They also offer delicacies, shellcraft products as well as fresh and processed marine products.

Existing land use indicates a predominance of agriculture which covers 38.2% of the total land area. Most of the agricultural lands are dominantly planted with coconut trees. Other major crops include vegetables, root crops, palay, corn, banana and other fruit trees, coffee and pineapple.

The municipality is likewise rich in mineral resources. It has an estimated mineral reserve of bauxite, nickel and titaferous magnitie of more than 26.7 million metric tons. The most companies that Mined in the Municipality were Japanese during the 70s, 80s and the 90s, they brought about raw Mineral Ore to Japan then by empty ship back they brought with them some Japanese Surplus Motors and chopped spare parts including Electrical Appliances.

Transportation

By air
Guiuan Airport has a 2,800-metre (9,200-ft) runway which can service light private planes, chartered cargo and military planes. The Guiuan Airport was upgraded in 2010. Cebu-based airline Mid-Sea Express had scheduled flights from Cebu City to Guiuan twice weekly on Saturdays and Mondays, using a 19-seater Jetstream 32 aircraft. Service started in 2012 but has now been discontinued.

By land
The town is accessible by land with highway connection from Tacloban City, about three-four hours travel. Several buses and vans regularly shuttle passengers to Guiuan. It is also accessible from Borongan. Alternatively, several bus companies have daily trips to Guiuan from Manila. Travel time is approximately twenty-one hours.

Since the town is a coastal municipality, it has a small seaport operational throughout the year.

Point of Interest
Sulangan Church
The church is also known as The Shrine of St. Anthony of Padua. It is known to both the locals and pilgrims around Eastern Visayas because of being miraculous. Saint Anthony of Padua is considered the patron saint for lost items, articles, people, or even spiritual goods. Many people visit the church to ask Saint Anthony even the most impossible wishes and the saint is believed to grant them.

Linao Cave
Linao Cave is one of the most famous attractions in Guiuan because of its crystal clear water. The cave is named linao which means “clear” in Waray.

Utilities

Telephone companies operating in the municipality includes TELECOM, Globelines and Bayantel. Smart and Globe cellular phone companies are also operational. The town also has a local radio station, Radyo Natin Guiuan (103.7 MHz), serving Guiuan and neighboring areas in Eastern Visayas.

In 2004, Eastern Samar Electric Cooperative (ESAMELCO) was able to energize Guiuan, Calicoan Island up to Sulangan covering 37 out of 60 barangays. Island barangays are served with electricity through generator sets either privately owned or operated by the barangay council. However, electricity shortages are frequent and subscribers experience weekly power failures, lasting for 10 to 12 hours or for 24 hours in severe cases.

Guiuan is also the site of one of the weather stations of the Philippine Atmospheric, Geophysical and Astronomical Services Administration, located in Barangay Sapao. The radar station was built and renovated with the aid of the Japan International Cooperation Agency (JICA).

References

External links

 Official website
 Philippine Standard Geographic Code
 Philippine Census Information
 Local Governance Performance Management System 

 
Surfing locations in the Philippines
Mining communities in the Philippines
Municipalities of Eastern Samar